Les Marquises is Jacques Brel's fourteenth and final album. Also known as Brel, the album was released 17 November 1977 by Barclay (96 010). This was the singer's first album of new songs in ten years and was released a year before his death from lung cancer. The album's themes include death ("Jaurès", "Vieillir", "Jojo"), parting ("Orly") and in several songs Brel evokes his career in the 1960s ("Les F..", "Jojo", "Knokke-le-Zoute Tango", "Vieillir"). The album was recorded live in Studio B at the Barclay Studios on Avenue Hoche, Paris. With his health failing, Brel was only able to record at most two songs per day. Brel returned to the Marquesas Islands shortly after the recording sessions.

The album was treated with great secrecy before its release and was delivered to reviewers in a reinforced metal box with a timed, electronic padlock
to stop them listening to it before its release date. No airplay of the album was allowed and no singles were released until after its release, and there were no interviews or promotion given by Brel regarding the album. Despite this, the album reached number one in France and earned Brel a gold record for selling 100,000 albums in 1978 and went platinum in 1981. It is estimated that the album sold 1,127,100 copies.

The album was reissued on 23 September 2003 under the title Les Marquises as part of the 16-CD box set Boîte à Bonbons by Barclay (980 817-7).

Track listing 

 Tracks 1–12 constituted the original 1977 release of the album. 
 Tracks 13–17 were recorded during the same sessions but Brel found them unfinished and asked his producer Barclay to not release them, they were added later to the album when it was reissued as part of the 16-CD box set Boîte à Bonbons.
 "Les F..." adapted from "The Frog" excerpt from João Donato A Bad Donato (1970).

Personnel 

 Jacques Brel – composer, vocals
 François Rauber – orchestra conductor, arrangements, liner notes
 François Rauber et Son Orchestre - orchestra
 Gérard Jouannest – piano, liner notes
 Marcel Azzola – accordion
 Maddly Bamy - voice on "Le lion" (uncredited)
 Sylvain Taillet – producer
 Gerhardt Lehner – recording engineer & audio mixing
 Jean-Pierre Michau - recording assistant
 Laurent Guéneau – audio mixing (tracks 13–17)
 Jean-Marie Guérin – mastering
 Jean-Michel Deligny – photography (inner)
 Alain Marouani – photography

References

Marquises, Les
1977 albums
Albums conducted by François Rauber
Albums arranged by François Rauber
French-language albums
Barclay (record label) albums
Universal Records albums